The Revolutionary Tribunal (unofficially Popular Tribunal) was a court instituted by the National Convention during the French Revolution for the trial of political offenders. It eventually became one of the most powerful engines of the Reign of Terror.

Judicial reforms

Early 1791 freedom of defence became the standard; any citizen was allowed to defend another. From the beginning, the authorities were concerned about this experiment. Derasse suggests it was a "collective suicide" by the lawyers in the Assembly.  In criminal cases, the expansion of the right ... gave priority to the spoken word. By December 1791 deputies voted themselves the power to select the judges, jury and accusateur public. On 15 February 1792 the Tribunal Criminel was installed with Maximilien Robespierre as accusateur. On 10 April Robespierre decided to give up his position and became an ordinary citizen who published a magazine. Along with other Jacobins, he urged in the fifth issue of his magazine the creation of an "armée révolutionnaire" in Paris, consisting of at least 20 or 23,000 men, to defend the city, "liberty" (the revolution), maintain order in the sections and educate the members in democratic principles; an idea he borrowed from Jean-Jacques Rousseau.

Origin

The provisional Revolutionary Tribunal was established on 17 August 1792 in response to the Storming of the Tuileries. To ensure that there was some appropriate legal process for dealing with suspects accused of political crimes and treason, rather than arbitrary killing by local committees, Maximilien Robespierre proposed that a new Tribunal be set up, with extraordinary powers to impose the death sentence. The Tribunal was abolished in November 1792 at the start of the trial of Louis XVI, and during this time had sentenced twenty-eight people to death. Mostly these were ordinary criminals rather than political prisoners.

The Revolutionary Tribunal was re-established at a time of crisis in the new French Republic. In the Spring of 1793, the war with the First Coalition was going badly and food shortages were worsening. The government responded by taking a number of measures to defend the integrity of the Republic. On 24 February the National Convention decided to create an army of 300,000 by means of a levée en masse; on 9 March it decided to send a représentant en mission from the Convention to every département.

Even in these circumstances, the Convention was initially reluctant to restore the Revolutionary Tribunal.  On 10 March, responding to serious disorder in the streets of Paris, Georges Danton, with Robespierre's support, proposed its revival, but the majority of deputés were not in favour. After a long debate, towards midnight, Danton was able to persuade a majority to vote for it only by raising the spectre of further uncontrolled massacres, as had taken place the previous September.  If the Convention did not agree to create the Tribunal, he argued, the people would be compelled to make their own justice. "Let us be terrible," said Danton, "so that the people will not have to be." On this basis, the Convention finally agreed that there should be established in Paris the Extraordinary Criminal Tribunal (Tribunal criminel extraordinaire), which received the official name of the Revolutionary Tribunal by a decree of 29 October 1793.

Other measures taken in response to the crisis around the same time included the formal establishment of a Revolutionary Watch Committee in every neighbourhood  and the creation of the Committee of Public Safety on 6 April.

Form

The court was to hear cases of alleged counter-revolutionary offences from across France. It was composed of a jury of twelve. This was an innovation in French justice, borrowed from English law (although for the Revolutionary Tribunal the jury was carefully selected from politically reliable activists). It had five judges, a public prosecutor, and two deputy prosecutors, all nominated by the Convention; and from its judgements, there was no appeal. Jacques-Bernard-Marie Montané became President of the Tribunal until he was replaced in his post on 23 August 1793 by M. J. A. Herman. Fouquier-Tinville served as public prosecutor. The lists of prisoners to be sent before the tribunal were prepared by a popular commission and signed, after revision, by the Committee of General Security and the Committee of Public Safety jointly.

On 5 September 1793, the Convention declared that "terror is the order of the day" and split the Revolutionary Tribunal into four concurrent chambers so that the number of cases it dealt with could be greatly increased.  It also decided that all jurors in the Tribunal should be directly appointed by the Committee of Public Safety or the Committee of General Security. This followed the news that rebels in Toulon had handed the city over to the British and several days of rioting in Paris.

Operation
One of the earliest cases brought to the Tribunal led to its most famous acquittal. On 13 April 1793 Girondin deputés brought an accusation against Jean-Paul Marat. Crucially, this involved waiving the immunity enjoyed until then by members of the Convention (Marat was himself a deputé). Not only did the case against Marat collapse, but two days after his case was brought, members of the Paris Commune responded by bringing a case to the Tribunal against 22 leading Girondins. This case was dismissed, but the principle that Convention members could be tried by the Tribunal was an important one, and ultimately led to the Girondin leaders being tried and executed in October 1793.

During the months when Montané served as its President, the Tribunal dealt with 178 accused.  53% of these were set free after initial examination by a judge, without a full trial, while a further 17% were tried and acquitted by a jury. 5% were convicted and sentenced to imprisonment or deportation, and 25% were sentenced to death. From its formation up to September 1793, the Tribunal heard 260 cases and handed down 66 death penalties. As a result, it was criticized as ineffective by some Jacobins. The Law of Suspects (17 September 1793) greatly increased the number of prisoners who were imprisoned and might be brought to trial. Between October and the end of 1793 the Tribunal issued 177 death sentences.

Similar tribunaux révolutionnaires were also in operation in the various French departments. However, on 16 April 1794 (27 Germinal Year II) the Convention approved a report by St. Just proposing the abolition of the existing revolutionary tribunals in individual départements and requiring all suspects to be sent to the main tribunal in Paris. On 21 May 1794 the government decided that the Terror would be centralized, with almost all the tribunals in the provinces closed and all the trials held in Paris. The provincial tribunals which were allowed to continue their work were Bordeaux, Arras, and Nîmes in the south, as well as Arras and Cambrai in the north.

One day Robespierre decided: "The Tribunal will judge only one form of offence: High Treason; for which there is only one punishment, death. It is therefore useless that time should be wasted in long deliberations"

Following the attempted assassinations of Convention members Jean-Marie Collot d'Herbois on 23 May and Maximilien Robespierre on 25 May 1794, on 10 June (22 Prairial Year II) the so-called "Prairial Laws" were passed. These limited trials in the Revolutionary Tribunal to three days. They also prevented the Revolutionary Tribunal from calling witnesses, or from allowing defense counsel. Juries were to convict or acquit entirely on the basis of the accusation and the accused's own defense. Further, the new laws confined the Tribunal to only two possible verdicts – acquittal or death. Finally, the law cancelled all previous legislation on the same subject.  Without being explicit, this removed the immunity of members of the Convention which up till then had protected them from summary arrest and required that the Convention itself vote to send any of its members to trial.

Three days after the Prairial laws were passed, the guillotine was moved out of Paris. It had previously stood on the Place du Carrousel, was then moved to the Place de la Revolution, and then again to the Place St Antoine and later to the Place du Trône-Renversé. As the Revolutionary Tribunal accelerated the pace of executions, it became impractical to have it in the city.

Criticism
The powers of the Revolutionary Tribunal were granted by the Convention, and there was only limited criticism of it. Royalists, émigrés and federalists were clearly opposed to the Tribunal and its workings, but since public criticism in Paris or in the press would be regarded as treasonable, it barely existed.  At the same time, there were periodic demands from Enragés and Hébertists that the Tribunal accelerate its work and condemn more of the accused.

Among the first to speak up publicly against the Tribunal was Camille Desmoulins in his short-lived journal, "Le Vieux Cordelier".  As a result of his criticisms he was expelled from the Jacobin Club.  Later he was arrested, tried and executed together with Danton.

On the eve of his execution, Danton expressed his regret for having advocated the Tribunal. "It was just a year ago that I was the means of instituting the Revolutionary Tribunal; may God and man forgive me for what I did then; but it was not that it might become the scourge of humanity."

Although the Revolutionary Tribunal was not criticized directly in the Convention while Robespierre held power, his proposals for the Prairial Laws were met with dismay when they were presented to the Convention. Some of the deputies were uneasy, in particular, about the removal of their immunity.  They agreed to the law when Robespierre insisted on it, but the following day attempted to amend it, obliging Robespierre to return to the Convention and make them restore the original version.

After Thermidor

After the overthrow of Robespierre in July 1794, some people expected the Revolutionary Tribunal to be abolished, but this did not happen. In the five days after the Thermidorian Reaction, the Convention freed 478 political prisoners, but 8,000 still remained incarcerated, despite popular demands for a general amnesty.

On 1 August 1794 (14 Thermidor Year II) the Prairial Laws were revoked, meaning that the burden of proof against suspects was once again with the prosecution. Soon afterwards, all of the judges on the Revolutionary Tribunal were replaced, and the local surveillance committees were curtailed, so that there were henceforth to be only twelve in Paris and one per district outside the capital. The Law on Suspects however remained in force.

The Revolutionary Tribunal was used by the Thermidorian Convention as an instrument to destroy the political leaders who had taken an active part in the Reign of Terror. On 16 December 1794 (26 Frimaire Year III) Jean-Baptiste Carrier was sentenced to death and executed. On 6 May 1795 (17 Floreal Year III), the former President of the Revolutionary Tribunal, Martial Herman, the former Chief Prosecutor Fouquier-Tinville and fourteen former jury members of the Revolutionary Tribunal were convicted, and the following day, guillotined. After most of those associated with the Reign of Terror had been eliminated, the Revolutionary Tribunal was finally suppressed on 31 May 1795 (12 Prairial Year III).

While the Convention itself had most people associated with the Revolutionary Tribunal in Paris executed, no similar official process was followed in the provinces. In 1795, the First White Terror broke out in parts of the country, particularly in the South East, as anti-Jacobin mobs attacked and murdered people who had been associated with revolutionary tribunals in their area. On 14 February 1795 for example, Joseph Fernex, who had served as a judge on the Tribunal in Orange, was killed and thrown into the Rhône by a mob. On 27 June other members of the same tribunal received the same treatment.

Assessment
From the beginning of 1793 to the Thermidorian Reaction, 17,000 people were sentenced and beheaded by some form of revolutionary court in France (in Paris or in the provinces), in addition to some 25,000 others who were summarily executed in the September Massacres, retributions in the War in the Vendée and elsewhere. The Paris Revolutionary Tribunal was responsible for 16% of all death sentences.

Of all those accused by the Revolutionary Tribunal, about half were acquitted (the number dropped to a quarter after the enactment of the Law of 22 Prairial Year II) (10 June 1794). Before 22 Prairial the Revolutionary Tribunal had pronounced 1,220 death sentences in thirteen months; during the forty-nine days between the passing of the law and the fall of Robespierre 1,376 persons were condemned (an average of 28 per day).

List of the court presidents 
 Jacques-Bernard-Marie Montané 13. March 1793 to 23. August 1793
 Martial Herman 28. August 1793 to 7. April 1794
 René-François Dumas 8. April 1794 to 27. July 1794
 Claude-Emmanuel Dobsen 28. July 1794 to 31. May 1795

List of the public prosecutor 
 (Louis-Joseph Faure) rejects his election on March 13, 1793
 Antoine Quentin Fouquier-Tinville 13. March 1793 to 1. August 1794
 Michel-Joseph Leblois August 1794 to January 1795
 Antoine Judicis January 1795 to 31. May 1795

References

Sources

Further reading
 TABLEAU RECAPITULATIF DES JUGEMENTS RENDUS PAR LE TRIBUNAL
 Actes du tribunal révolutionnaire, éditions Mercure de France, coll. « Le temps retrouvé », 2005, 640 p. .
 Archives parlementaires de 1787 à 1860 : recueil complet des débats législatifs et politiques des Chambres françaises, 1re série, 1787 à 1799. t. lx.
 Jean-Baptiste Sirey, Du tribunal révolutionnaire, frimaire an III (1794), chez l'imprimeur Du Pont, Rue de la Loi (Paris), 104 pages.

External links
 Conspiracy and Terror in the French Revolution – Marisa Linton (Kingston University) Public Lecture

1793 events of the French Revolution
1794 events of the French Revolution
1795 events of the French Revolution
1793 establishments in France
1795 disestablishments